The Loddon School is a British private school for children who have severe and complex learning difficulties. Children catered for have problems associated with autism and epilepsy, including self injury, aggression and disruptive behaviour. The school is located on Wildmoor Lane in Sherfield on Loddon in the English county of Hampshire. It was founded in 1988 as a charitable trust and, as of 2010, caters for up to 29 children at one time, with over 180 staff providing education and care in a residential setting.

See also
 Education in England

References 

Educational institutions established in 1988
Private schools in Hampshire
Schools for people on the autistic spectrum
Special schools in Hampshire
1988 establishments in England